Coccopigya viminensis is a species of sea snail, deep-sea limpet, a marine gastropod mollusk in the family Cocculinidae.

Description

Distribution
The type locality is "Tuscan Sea" (Tuscan Archipelago) in depths 450–500 m.

References

Cocculinidae
Gastropods described in 1990